HMHS Dover Castle (His Majesty's Hospital Ship) was a steam ship originally built for the Union-Castle Line and launched in 1904. In 1914 she was requisitioned for use as a British hospital ship during the First World War.

History
SS Dover Castle was built by Barclay Curle & Company, Glasgow as yard number 443, in 1904 and launched on 4 February 1904. She was powered by quadruple expansion stream engines. She was built as a combined passenger and cargo vessel for the Union-Castle Mail Steamship Company, of London.

She was not carrying any troops but out of her 314 crew members, 12 died. The others (302) were saved by the Dover Castle.

Sinking

The initial explosion killed seven boiler stokers, but the crew was able to evacuate the wounded onto .

Prosecution
Kptlt. Karl Neumann, commanding officer of UC-67, was tried for sinking the hospital ship at the Leipzig War Crimes Trials. The German Reichsgericht (Supreme Court) found him not guilty. Neumann admitted torpedoing the ship but pleaded that he was obeying orders issued by the German Admiralty. The German Government had asserted that the Allies were using hospital ships for military purposes and declared on 19 March 1917 that German submarines could attack hospital ships not complying with several German conditions. The court held that Neumann believed the order to be a lawful reprisal and therefore was not personally responsible for the sinking.

See also
List of hospital ships sunk in World War I

References

Ships built on the River Clyde
Hospital ships in World War I
Hospital ships of the Royal Navy
Ships of the Union-Castle Line
Ships sunk by German submarines in World War I
World War I shipwrecks in the Mediterranean Sea
1904 ships
Maritime incidents in 1917